Kuczyn may refer to the following places in Poland:

 Kuczyn, Mońki County
 Kuczyn, Wysokie Mazowieckie County